Shankar is a village in the Nakodar tehsil of Jalandhar district in Punjab, India.

About 
Shankar is a large size village that lies on the Nakodar-Jandiala Road. The nearest railway station to this village is Shankar Railway station about 2 km from the village. One of the oldest villages of the state of Punjab, this village has given birth to many scholarly people, politicians, army officers, engineers, doctors, prominent teachers and journalists.

Notable persons
 Swaran Singh - India's longest-serving union cabinet minister.

External links
 Chhinjh Mela Shankar Shri Krishan Akhada, Chhinjh Committee, VPO: Shankar, Jalandhar, Punjab (INDIA-144042)

References

Villages in Jalandhar district
Villages in Nakodar tehsil